Seyed Peyman Hosseini (born 16 February 1984) is an Iranian beach soccer player who plays for Shahriar Sari in the Iran Premier Beach Soccer League. He plays in the goalkeeper position. Hosseini has represented Iran at three FIFA Beach Soccer World Cups (2013, 2015, and 2017).

Hosseini is known as one of the best beach soccer goalkeepers of his generation and was named the best goalkeeper in the 2017 FIFA Beach Soccer World Cup, in which Iran finished in third place, and also was named the best goalkeeper in the world for the year 2017.

Club career

Shamoushak
Hosseini started his career playing association football with the youth teams of Shamoushak Noshahr. He made his debut with the first team in 2005 in a match against Bargh Shiraz. After the age of 22 he switched to playing Beach soccer.

International career
Hosseini joined the Iran national beach soccer team in 2011 and became the number one goalkeeper in 2012. He was named the best goalkeeper of the 2013 AFC Beach Soccer Championship. Hosseini was named as the best goalkeeper of the 2017 FIFA Beach Soccer World Cup and helped Iran to a best ever third-place finish.

Honours

Beach soccer
 Iran
'FIFA Beach Soccer World Cup Third place: 2017Beach Soccer Intercontinental Cup winner: 2013Asian Championship winner : 2013,2017 Third place: 2015, 2011, 2008Asian Beach Games winner: 2012, 2014 Third place: 2010

IndividualBest goalkeeper of the year: 2017Best goalkeeper: 2017 FIFA Beach Soccer World CupGoal of the Tournament: 2017 FIFA Beach Soccer World Cup Best goalkeeper''': 2015 AFC Beach Soccer Championship

References

External links 

 

1984 births
Living people
Iranian footballers
Iranian beach soccer players
Beach soccer goalkeepers
Sportspeople from Mazandaran province
Association football goalkeepers
Iranian sportspeople
People from Nowshahr